David S. Ebert is a computer scientist, holding the position of Silicon Valley Professor of Electrical and Computer Engineering Department at Purdue University.

Ebert's research focuses on computer graphics and visualization. Currently, he is the director of U.S. DHS Center of Excellence (COE) in Visual Analytics (VACCINE). and Center for Education and Research in Information Assurance and Security (CERIAS)

Education 

He received his Ph.D., master, and bachelor degrees in Computer Science from Ohio State University in 1991, 1987, 1986 respectively.

Career 

He joined Purdue University as an associate professor in 2000, was promoted to a full professor in 2006.

Publications 
 Ebert DS, Musgrave FK, Peachey D, Perlin K, Worley S. Texturing & modeling: a procedural approach. Morgan Kaufmann; 2003. Cited 1438 times according to Google Scholar
 Zhu F, Bosch M, Woo I, Kim S, Boushey CJ, Ebert DS, Delp EJ. The use of mobile devices in aiding dietary assessment and evaluation. IEEE journal of selected topics in signal processing. 2010 May 27;4(4):756-66. Cited 311 times according to Google Scholar

References

External links 
 David Ebert's Homepage

Year of birth missing (living people)
Living people
American computer scientists
Ohio State University College of Engineering alumni
Purdue University faculty